The Mid-Atlantic Championship was a professional golf tournament on the Web.com Tour played at TPC Potomac at Avenel Farm. Proceeds from the Mid-Atlantic Championship benefited the Salute Military Golf Association.

From 2007 to 2011, it was played as the Melwood Prince George's County Open. It was renamed the Neediest Kids Championship in 2012, and benefited Neediest Kids

In 2010 and 2011, it was played on the University of Maryland Golf Course in College Park, Maryland. From 2007 to 2009, it was played at the Country Club at Woodmore in Mitchellville, Maryland. Since 2012, it has been played at TPC Potomac at Avenel Farm in Potomac, Maryland. The 2013 purse was $600,000, with $108,000 going to the winner.

In 2013, Mid-Atlantic Championship organizer IGP Sports & Entertainment Group was acquired by IMG.

Winners

Bolded golfers graduated to the PGA Tour via the Web.com Tour regular-season money list.

References

External links

Coverage on PGA Tour's official site

Former Korn Ferry Tour events
Golf in Maryland
Recurring sporting events established in 2007
Recurring sporting events disestablished in 2013
2007 establishments in Maryland
2013 disestablishments in Maryland